Concurso Nacional de Belleza 1987 was held on December 10, 1986. There were 28 candidates who competed for the national crown. The winner represented the Dominican Republic at Miss Universe 1987. The Señorita República Dominicana Mundo entered Miss World 1987. The Señorita República Dominicana Café entered Reinado Internacional del Café 1987. Only the 19 delegates  participated representing the National District and provinces. The pageant was held for the first time in Santiago de los Caballeros at the Centro Español. The top 10 they showed their evening gowns and answered questions to go to the top 5. In the top 5 they answered more questions.

Results

Delegates

Azua - Suany Arias
Dajabón - Patricia Peralta
Distrito Nacional - Natacha Acevedo
Distrito Nacional - Marisol Polanco
Distrito Nacional - Noris Briones Castillo
Distrito Nacional - Jacqueline Soñé Alfonseca
Distrito Nacional - Rosanna Diep
Distrito Nacional - Luisa Esther Cruz
Distrito Nacional - Lesdia Noemí Acosta Jiménez
Distrito Nacional - Miguelina Ruiz
Elías Piña - Miguelina Hermoso
María Trinidad Sánchez - Maritza Cabrera
Pedernales - Isaura Ramírez
Puerto Plata - Martha de la Mota
Salcedo - Paula del Carmen Lora García
Santiago - Magaly Capellán
Santiago - Carmen Rita Pérez Pellerano
Santiago - Rocío Battle
Valverde - Mariledys Acosta

External links
 https://web.archive.org/web/20090211102742/http://ogm.elcaribe.com.do/ogm/consulta.aspx

Miss Dominican Republic
1987 beauty pageants
1987 in the Dominican Republic